Teramulus is a genus of fresh and brackish water silversides endemic to Madagascar.

Species
The currently recognized species in this genus are:
 Teramulus kieneri J. L. B. Smith, 1965 (Kiener's silverside)
 Teramulus waterloti (Pellegrin, 1932)

References 

 
Atherinomorinae
Taxonomy articles created by Polbot